Fairview Methodist Church is a historic church near Oakland in Warren County, Kentucky.  It was added to the National Register in 1979.

It is a one-and-a-half-story frame church.  Its Kentucky Historic Resources evaluation notes:The significance of this church lies in its fine state of preservation and in its strength of design, perhaps the best in the county's late nineteenth century frame churches. It is traditional in form and representative of vernacular wooden church architecture. Because of its siting on a flat, intensively cultivated plain, it is a visual focus on the landscape for miles around.

References

Methodist churches in Kentucky
Churches on the National Register of Historic Places in Kentucky
Carpenter Gothic church buildings in Kentucky
Churches in Warren County, Kentucky
National Register of Historic Places in Warren County, Kentucky